Baifu is a railway station on the Taiwan Railways Administration West Coast line located in Qidu District, Keelung City, Taiwan.

History
The station was built as a result of TRA's policy of transforming its railroad lines into MRT-type railroad. The construction of the station was started on 23 June 2005 and was opened for public use on 8 May 2007. The station is mostly used by commuters traveling to and from Keelung and Taipei, and the only trains that stop here are the local trains.

See also
 List of railway stations in Taiwan

References

External links

TRA Baifu Station
Taiwan Railways Administration

Railway stations served by Taiwan Railways Administration
Railway stations in Keelung
2007 establishments in Taiwan
Railway stations opened in 2007